Sportverein Lafnitz (known as SV Licht-Loidl Lafnitz for sponsorship purposes) is an Austrian association football club from Lafnitz. Currently playing in the 2. Liga after their promotion in 2018, and plays their home games at the Sportplatz Lafnitz in Lafnitz.

History
The club, which belongs to the Styria Football Association, was founded in 1964 and played predominantly in the subclasses of Styria.

With the takeover of the Obmannstelle by Bernhard Loidl, who previously supported the club with his company Licht Loidl as a sponsor, in 2009, the club achieved great sporting success. He missed the club new structures that had a positive effect on the athletic performance. At two-year intervals, championship titles were celebrated, with which, by 2013, the rise from the sixth performance level to the third performance level, the Regionalliga Mitte, was achieved.

In parallel, in the years 2011 and 2012, the old, dilapidated sports field was transformed into a new, smart football arena with a new clubhouse and new grandstand. Although the municipality has only 1,400 inhabitants, the capacity is about 2000 spectators. While an average of around 800 spectators visited the home matches in the national league, there are currently around 1000 visitors in the regional league, most of whom come from neighboring Burgenland. Even in away games about 100 fans accompany the team.

The players of the team come for the most part from the region, which is a special bond with the spectators. There are some former players from neighboring second division TSV Hartberg at SV Lafnitz active.

Two players made the leap into professional football via Lafnitz: the Croatian Domagoj Bešlić, who returned to Lafnitz in January 2018, moved to second division Austria Klagenfurt in 2015; Albert Vallci joined the second-class SV Horn in 2016.

Promotion to the 2. Liga
Christian Waldl, who is in possession of the UEFA A license, came in the summer of 2012 from the USV Hartberg Umgebung and he succeeded right away to lead the team to the title in the Landesliga Steiermark. In September 2015, they parted company with Waldl. Waldl's successor was former Austrian international Ferdinand Feldhofer.

In the first season under Feldhofer (2015-16) the team finished in sixth place. In 2016-17, the Oststeirer finished just two points behind the champion TSV Hartberg in second place. In 2017–18 it was finally time: After Lafnitz held first place uninterrupted from the 13th round of the league standings, a 3-0 victory over the amateurs of the Wolfsberger AC on Matchday 26 guaranteed promotion to the 2. Liga. The ascent was definitively sealed by the admission award; The association received the approval in the first instance. In addition, the team was around coach Feldhofer on 28 Match day with a 3-1 victory over pursuers FC Gleisdorf 09 to clinch the championship title in the Regionalliga Mitte.

Since its ascension to the 2. Liga for the 2018-19 season, Lafnitz has steadily climbed the table each year. After Feldhofer's departure at the end of 2019, current coach Philip Semlic has led the squad to finish as high as 4th place in the 2021-22 2. Liga and a 3rd round appearance in the 2021-22 Austrian Cup.

First-team squad

Current squad
Coaching staff

Coach history

Past seasons

Reserve squad

Coaching staff

Past seasons

Honours
Austrian Regionalliga Mitte (III)
Winners (1): 2017–18Runner-ups (1): 2016–17

Landesliga Steiermark (IV)
Winners (1): 2012–13

Oberliga Süd/Ost (V)
Winners (1): 2010–11, 2017–18 ‡

Unterliga Ost (VI)
Winners (1): 2008–09Runner-ups (1):'' 2016–17 ‡

Gebietsliga Ost (VII)
Winners (1): 2015–16 ‡

1. Klasse Mitte A (VIII)
Winners (1): 2014–15 ‡

‡ Reserve team

References

External links
 Official website 
 facebook
 twitter
 instagram

 
Football clubs in Austria
Association football clubs established in 1964
1964 establishments in Austria